Fritz Nottbrock (30 July 1910 – 13 March 1997) was a German hurdler. He competed in the 400 metres hurdles at the 1932 Summer Olympics and the 1936 Summer Olympics.

References

1910 births
1997 deaths
Athletes (track and field) at the 1932 Summer Olympics
Athletes (track and field) at the 1936 Summer Olympics
German male hurdlers
Olympic athletes of Germany
Athletes from Cologne